The Journal of International Dispute Settlement is a peer reviewed academic journal covering international dispute resolution. It is published by Oxford University Press. According to the Journal Citation Reports, the journal has a 2018 impact factor of 1.638.

References 

Oxford University Press academic journals
Law journals